The 1864 United States presidential election in Illinois took place on November 8, 1864, as part of the 1864 United States presidential election. Illinois voters chose 16 representatives, or electors, to the Electoral College, who voted for president and vice president.

Illinois was won by the incumbent President Abraham Lincoln (R-Illinois), running with former Senator and Military Governor of Tennessee Andrew Johnson, with 54.42% of the popular vote, against the 4th Commanding General of the United States Army George B. McClellan (D–New Jersey), running with Representative George H. Pendleton, with 45.58% of the vote.

Results

See also
 United States presidential elections in Illinois

References

Illinois
1864
1864 Illinois elections